Chyna Doll may refer to:

Chyna Doll (album), an album by Foxy Brown
Chyna Doll or Chyna (1969–2016), American professional wrestler

See also
China doll (disambiguation)